Roberto Sorlini (born 31 August 1947) is an Italian former racing cyclist. He rode in the 1975 Tour de France as well as seven editions of the Giro d'Italia and the 1978 Vuelta a España.

Major results
1968
 2nd Overall Giro della Valle d'Aosta
1971
 7th GP Forli
1973
 1st Stage 8a Tour de Suisse

Grand Tour general classification results timeline

References

External links
 

1947 births
Living people
Italian male cyclists
People from Darfo Boario Terme
Cyclists from the Province of Brescia
Tour de Suisse stage winners